Içara is a city in the Brazilian state of Santa Catarina. It is located 170 km south of Florianópolis, the state capital and around 890 km south of São Paulo. It is the Brazilian capital of the honey and tobacco industries, but is also very strong in plastic, ceramic tiles and chemicals.

Nearby cities are Siderópolis, Cocal do Sul, Morro da Fumaça, Maracajá, Araranguá, Nova Veneza, Forquilhinha and Criciuma.

Several small towns lie around Içara forming a metropolitan area of 250 thousand people. The most important are:
Criciuma (larger city)
Urussanga
Nova Veneza
Nova Trento
Siderópolis
Orleans
Araranguá
Timbe do Sul

Notable people
 

Jean Coral (born 1988), Brazilian footballer
Kathiê Librelato (born 1988), Chess player

References

External links
City’s official website (in Portuguese)

Municipalities in Santa Catarina (state)